The A923 is a major road in Dundee, Angus and Perth and Kinross, Scotland. It runs from Dundee to Dunkeld. Parts of it between Coupar Angus and Dunkeld follow the route of the Old Military Road, built following the Jacobite Rebellion.

References

Roads in Scotland
Transport in Fife